The 1979 Copa Interamericana was the 7th. edition of the Copa Interamericana. The final was contested by Paraguayan Club Olimpia (champion of 1979 Copa Libertadores) and Salvadoran club FAS (winner of 1979 CONCACAF Champions' Cup). The final was played under a two-leg format in February–March 1980. 

The first leg was held in Estadio Cuscatlán in San Salvador, where both teams tied 3–3. The second leg was played at Estadio Defensores del Chaco in Asunción, where Olimpia easily defeat FAS with a conclusive 5–0. Thus, the Paraguayan side won their first Copa Interamericana trophy.

Qualified teams

Venues

Match details

First Leg

Second Leg

References

Copa Interamericana
i
i
i
i